Adelante Andalucía is an Andalusian regionalist political coalition led by former Podemos Andalusia leader Teresa Rodríguez. The party was established as a refoundation from the late Adelante Andalucía electoral alliance formed by Podemos and United Left/The Greens–Assembly for Andalusia.

After announcing their intention to leave Podemos in February 2020, Teresa Rodríguez and the rest of the ex-Podemos parliamentarians affiliated with Anti-capitalists (Anticapitalistas) were subject to an expulsion from their parliamentary group in October 2020. The party was eventually refounded as a left-wing nationalist organisation in June 2021, with the participation of Anticapitalistas, Andalusian Spring (Primavera Andaluza), Andalusian Left (IzA) and Defend Andalusia (Defender Andalucía).

Composition

Electoral performance

Parliament of Andalusia

Notes

References

2021 establishments in Andalusia
Andalusian nationalist parties
Democratic socialist parties in Europe
Direct democracy parties
Feminist parties in Europe
Political parties established in 2021
Political parties in Andalusia
Socialist parties in Spain